Blyde River Bunters is a South Africa field hockey club. The club was established in 2016, and is one of 6 established to compete in South African Hockey Association's new premier domestic competition, Premier Hockey League.

History
The Blyde River Bunters have been inspired by famous tourist areas in Blyde River Canyon Nature Reserve in Mpumalanga.

Tournament history

Premier Hockey League
 2016 - 
 2017 - 
 2018 - 
 2019 - 5th

Teams
The women's team was announced on 10 July 2019.

Head Coach: Marcelle Keet

References

Field hockey clubs in South Africa
Field hockey clubs established in 2016
2016 establishments in South Africa
Premier Hockey League (South Africa)